Ernst Löfström (31 May 1865 – 5 January 1937) was a Finnish general in World War I and the Finnish Civil War. He fought on the side of the whites. He died in Helsinki.

References

1865 births
1937 deaths
People from Vyborg District
People from Viipuri Province (Grand Duchy of Finland)
Finnish generals
Imperial Russian major generals
Russian military personnel of World War I
People of the Finnish Civil War (White side)